Vernon Scot Thompson (born December 7, 1955) is a former a professional baseball player who played outfielder in the Major Leagues from  to  for the Chicago Cubs, Montreal Expos, and San Francisco Giants.

He was born in Grove City, Pennsylvania.

External links

1955 births
Living people
American expatriate baseball players in Canada
Baseball players from Pennsylvania
Chicago Cubs players
Gulf Coast Cubs players
Iowa Cubs players
Iowa Oaks players
Key West Cubs players
Major League Baseball outfielders
Midland Cubs players
Montreal Expos players
People from Grove City, Pennsylvania
San Francisco Giants players
Wichita Aeros players